is a former Japanese voice actress. She was born in Saitama Prefecture, and retired in 2010.

Roles

Anime
Azumanga Daioh (Chihiro)
Chibi Maruko (Yoko)
Gravion (Cecil)
Hamtaro (Lazuli)
I My Me! Strawberry Eggs (Akane Kuise)
Negima!? (Sakurako Shiina)
Shigofumi (Miku Ayase)
Shrine of the Morning Mist
The Melancholy of Haruhi Suzumiya (Sonou Mori)
Yakitate!! Japan (Kaede Matsushiro)

Drama CDs
I My Me! Strawberry Eggs (Akane Kuise)

Dubbing
Animal Rescue Kids (Carrie)
Babe in the City
Dennis the Menace
Hercules
Joan of Arc (child Jeanne)
Nim's Island (Nim (Abigail Breslin))
101 Dalmatians II: Patch's London Adventure (Pixie)
Life with Derek (Marti Venturi (Ariel Waller))
Reservation Road (Emma Learner (Elle Fanning))
Sympathy for Mr. Vengeance (Yu-sun (Han Bo-bae))

Games
Imabikisō (Minagawa Kaori)
The Legend of Zelda: Spirit Tracks (Princess Zelda)

References

External links

1982 births
Living people
Japanese voice actresses
21st-century Japanese actresses
Ken Production voice actors